Anomis esocampta is a moth of the family Erebidae. It was described by George Hampson in 1926. It is found on Fiji.

References

Moths described in 1926
Catocalinae
Moths of Fiji